Aniyathi is a 1955 Indian Malayalam-language film, directed by M. Krishnan Nair and produced by P. Subramaniam. The film stars Prem Nazir and Miss Kumari. The film had musical score by Br. Lakshmanan. The popular song "Kunkuma Chaaraninju" is from this movie. Miss Kumari won Madras Film Fans Association Award for Best Actress (1956) for her performance in the film.

Cast
 Prem Nazir as Rajappan
 Jayan as James
 Jayabharathi  as Sreedevi
 Vincent as Vijayan
 Sukumaran as Raghavan
 Unnimary as Ragini
 K.P Ummer as Inspector.Madhavan
 Nandhitha Bose  as Thankhamma 
 Adoorbhasi  as Vasu Pilla
 Seema as Cabret dancer in The song "Madhonmadha raathri"

References

External links
 

1955 films
1950s Malayalam-language films
Films directed by M. Krishnan Nair
Films scored by Br Lakshmanan